Janet Dando is an international lawn bowler representing Spain.

Bowls career
Dando joined the Spanish squad in 2007. In 2011, she won a bronze medal in the pairs with Sheri Fletcher at the Atlantic Bowls Championships.

She represented Spain in the triples event and fours event at the 2012 World Outdoor Bowls Championship. In 2013, she won three medals including a gold medal at the European Bowls Championships in Spain.

References 

Living people
Bowls European Champions
Year of birth missing (living people)